Barbara Tarbuck (January 15, 1942 – December 26, 2016) was an American film, television, and stage actress from Detroit, Michigan, best known for her recurring role as Lady Jane Jacks on General Hospital.

Life and career
Tarbuck was born in Detroit, Michigan. From the ages of 9-13, Tarbuck performed as a regular on the children's series Storyland, which aired on the Detroit AM radio station WWJ. From there, she learned acting skills from veteran actors on radio shows such as The Lone Ranger, The Shadow and The Green Hornet.

Tarbuck attended Cooley High School and Wayne State University. Upon winning the Eva Woodbridge Victor Scholarship, she finished her Bachelors in 1963. While in college, she participated in the production of Where's Charley, which toured through Europe. She also earned her master's degree in Theatre from the University of Michigan. She then went to Indiana University to work as the lead actress in their inaugural theatre touring company season.

She began to work on her PhD and taught beginning acting. While at Indiana University, she was granted a Fulbright Scholarship to the London Academy of Music and Dramatic Art. She then moved to New York City to pursue her acting career in stage, film, and television productions. In her later career, alongside her acting roles, she taught acting at UCLA.

She married James Denis Connolly in 1980; he died in 2005. They had one child, Jennifer Lane Connolly, who is a documentary producer.

Tarbuck contracted the neurodegenerative Creutzfeldt–Jakob disease and died due to complications at her Los Angeles home on December 26, 2016.

Film

Television

Theatre

References

External links

1942 births
2016 deaths
20th-century American actresses
21st-century American actresses
American child actresses
American film actresses
American radio actresses
American soap opera actresses
American stage actresses
American television actresses
Alumni of the London Academy of Music and Dramatic Art
Indiana University alumni
Actresses from Detroit
University of Michigan School of Music, Theatre & Dance alumni
Wayne State University alumni
UCLA School of Theater, Film and Television faculty
Deaths from Creutzfeldt–Jakob disease
Neurological disease deaths in California
Cooley High School alumni